The former National Westminster Bank in Spring Gardens, Manchester, England, is an Edwardian bank building constructed in 1902 for Parr's Bank by Charles Heathcote.  The bank is in a "bold Edwardian Baroque" style.  It is a Grade II* listed building as of 25 February 1952.

The bank is built of red sandstone with a corner tower and cupola, Doric columns supporting nothing but ornamental brackets, and hooded gables.  The vast plate glass windows designed to illuminate the banking hall are particularly striking, each with "a large round-headed window filling the width of each bay, with moulded head, scrolled keystone, and plate-glass glazing with enriched bronze 'ferramenta' including a horizontal mid-panel, bottom panels with stained glass, and arched upper lights with margin panes".

The interior is "amongst the most opulent of any of the date surviving in Manchester, and for that matter, in London".  The foyer has mahogany panelling, whilst the main banking hall is walled with green marble.  The stained glass, some of which is original, and the ironwork on the exterior are Art Nouveau.
The bank is now a bar.

See also

Grade II* listed buildings in Greater Manchester
Listed buildings in Manchester-M2

Notes

References

Grade II* listed buildings in Manchester
Art Nouveau architecture in Manchester
Art Nouveau commercial buildings
Commercial buildings completed in 1902
Office buildings in Manchester
Grade II* listed banks
NatWest Group